Nationality words link to articles with information on the nation's poetry or literature (for instance, Irish or France).

Events
 John Locke writes his essay Some Thoughts Concerning Education which discusses how poetry and music should not be included as part of an educational curriculum

Works

Britain
 Richard Ames, Fatal Friendship; or, The Drunkards Misery
 John Dryden and Jacob Tonson, editors, Examen Poeticum: Being the Third Part of Miscellany Poems, one of six anthologies published by Tonson from 1684 to 1709; sometimes this is referred to as "Tonson's third Miscellany, sometimes as "Dryden's third Miscellany, or just "the third Miscellany; the volume includes:
 Dryden's translation of the first book of Ovid's Metamorphoses
 Dryden, "Iphis and Ianthe", a "fable" translated from Book 9 of Metamorphoses
 Dryden, "Acis, Polyphemus and Galatea", translation from Book 13 of Metamorphoses
 Dryden, "The Last Parting of Hector and Andromache", translation from Homer's Iliad
 John Dryden, editor, The Satires of Decimus Junius Juvenalis, an anthology including translations by Dryden, Nahum Tate, William Congreve and others
 Robert Gould, The Corruption of the Times by Money
 Benjamin Keach, The Everlasting Covenant 
 Samuel Wesley, The Life of Our Blessed Lord

Other languages
 Nicolas Boileau-Despréaux, Discours sur l'Ode, criticism; the author defended Pindar and advocated enthusiasm in lyric poetry

Births
Death years link to the corresponding "[year] in poetry" article:

 Hildebrand Jacob, English poet (died 1739)

Deaths
Birth years link to the corresponding "[year] in poetry" article:
 January 8 – Jan Andrzej Morsztyn (born 1621), Polish poet and member of the noble Szlachta class
 September 9 – Ihara Saikaku (born 1642), Japanese poet and creator of the ukiyo-zōshi ("books of the floating world") genre of prose fiction
 December 13 – Dosoftei (born 1624), Moldavian Metropolitan, scholar, poet and translator

See also

 List of years in poetry
 List of years in literature
 17th century in poetry
 17th century in literature
 Poetry

Notes

17th-century poetry
Poetry